George Barrington Porter (11 June 1939  –  3 November 1996) was a British lawyer and Conservative Party politician.

Early life
Educated at Birkenhead School and the University of Oxford, he trained as a solicitor and was a partner and later a consultant at Fanshaw Porter & Hazlehurst Solicitors in Birkenhead.

Parliamentary career
Porter contested a number of seats before he found success. He fought a by-election for Liverpool Scotland in 1971, Newton in the February 1974 general election, and Chorley in October 1974.

He was first elected at the 1979 general election as Member of Parliament (MP) for Bebington and Ellesmere Port.  After boundary changes for the 1983 election, he was returned for the new constituency of Wirral South.

His death in 1996 aged 57, after suffering from cancer, eliminated the majority of one enjoyed by the government of John Major in the House of Commons, and the consequent February 1997 by-election was won by Labour's Ben Chapman.

Legacy
A caricature of Porter hangs in the lounge bar of the Cask and Glass Public House in Victoria, London.

References

External links 
 

1939 births
1996 deaths
People educated at Birkenhead School
Conservative Party (UK) MPs for English constituencies
UK MPs 1979–1983
UK MPs 1983–1987
UK MPs 1987–1992
UK MPs 1992–1997
Politics of the Metropolitan Borough of Wirral
Deaths from cancer
Alumni of University College, Oxford